Porter Pool Bathhouse is a historic bathhouse located at Shelbyville, Shelby County, Indiana. It was built in 1930, and is a -story, rectangular, Art Deco style brick building.

It was listed on the National Register of Historic Places in 2001.

Upon closure of Porter Pool, the property and building has since been repurposed as the Shelby County Tourism and Visitors Bureau Welcome Center and the Shelby County Chamber of Commerce. <httpl://www.shelbycountytourism.com>

References

Park buildings and structures on the National Register of Historic Places in Indiana
Art Deco architecture in Indiana
Buildings and structures completed in 1930
Buildings and structures in Shelby County, Indiana
National Register of Historic Places in Shelby County, Indiana
Public baths on the National Register of Historic Places
1930 establishments in Indiana